Gangjong of Goryeo (10 May 1152–26 August 1213) (r. 1211–1213) was the 22nd ruler of the Goryeo dynasty of Korea. He was the eldest son of King Myeongjong.

Gangjong was confirmed as heir in 1173. In 1197, he and his father were driven to Ganghwado by the military leader Choe Chung-heon. In 1210 Gangjong returned to the capital, and he was given a royal title by Huijong in the following year. After Choe drove Huijong from power that year, Gangjong was placed on the throne.

Gangjong's tomb is located outside the old Goryeo capital, in modern-day Hyŏnhwa-ri, Kaepung-gun, Hwanghaenam-do, North Korea.

Family
Father: Myeongjong of Goryeo (고려 명종)
Grandfather: Injong of Goryeo (고려 인종)
Grandmother: Queen Gongye (공예왕후)
Mother: Queen Uijeong (의정왕후)
Grandfather: Wang-On, Duke Gangneung (왕온 강릉공)
Grandmother: Lady Gim (부인 김씨)
Sister: Princess Yeonhui (연희궁주)
Sister: Princess Suan (수안궁주)
Consorts and their Respective issue(s):
Queen Sapyeong of the Jeonju Yi clan (사평왕후 이씨)
Princess Suryeong (수령궁주)
Queen Wondeok of the Gaeseong Wang clan (원덕왕후 왕씨; d. 1239); half fourth cousin once removed.
Crown Prince Wang Cheol (태자 왕철)
Unknown
Princess Jeonghwa (정화택주)
Prince Wang (소군 왕씨)
Prince Wang (소군 왕씨)
Prince Wang (소군 왕씨)
Prince Wang (소군 왕씨)
Prince Wang (소군 왕씨)
Prince Wang (소군 왕씨)
Prince Wang (소군 왕씨)
Prince Wang (소군 왕씨)
Prince Wang (소군 왕씨)

Popular culture
 Portrayed by Park Byung-sun and Lee-in in the 2003-2004 KBS TV series Age of Warriors.

See also
List of Korean monarchs
Goryeo

References

 

1152 births
1213 deaths
13th-century Korean monarchs
People from Kaesong